The Mystic Schooners are a collegiate summer baseball team that operates in the Mystic, Connecticut region. The franchise is one of the two oldest franchises in the New England Collegiate Baseball League.

Originally known as the Eastern Tides, and later the Thread City Tides, playing in Willimantic, Connecticut, the franchise was purchased by former Boston Red Sox General Manager Dan Duquette in 2004. Duquette's club was first known as the Berkshire Dukes, playing their home games at the Dan Duquette Sports Academy in Hinsdale, Massachusetts. Duquette moved the team to nearby Pittsfield in 2005 after reaching a lease agreement with the city that brought the Dukes to historic Wahconah Park. In November 2008 the team changed its name to the Pittsfield American Defenders after the ownership group that owned the American Defenders of New Hampshire, which included Duquette, bought into the team.

The team had struggled to compete in the NECBL since moving to Berkshire County, and did not enjoy a winning season or a playoff berth until 2008. The team's level of play has rebounded greatly since the disastrous summer of 2005, where the Dukes finished at a league-worst 11-31, the fourth fewest wins in NECBL history. The Defenders' fan base has continued to grow despite the team's struggles on the field, with a reported home attendance of 28,955 in 2007, the fourth-highest in the league.

In December 2009, the Defenders were sold to the Bristol Collegiate Baseball Club which moved the original franchise back to its beginning state of Connecticut.

On January 14, 2009 it was announced that the team's nickname would be the Bristol Nine, and team general manager Dan Kennedy unveiled a logo featuring "...the old looking player and the old style hat and the man with the mustache and the whole nine yards." The logo's design was credited to Bristol resident Brian Rooney. Shortly thereafter, it was revealed that the logo in question was actually the trademarked property of Top of the Third, Incorporated, owners of a minor-professional baseball team in Visalia, California. The logo, the creation of graphic designer Dan Simon, had originally been used by the California League's Mudville Nine. The Bristol Nine name was then abandoned, with team management adopting the Bristol Collegiate Baseball Club brand.

Following a one-year stint in Bristol, the team moved to Mystic, Connecticut for the 2011 season and was rebranded as the Mystic Schooners.

Franchise history

NECBL charter franchise and championships

The only remaining charter franchise in the NECBL, the Schooners began play as the Eastern Tides in 1994 in Willimantic, Connecticut. The team originally played home games at Eastern Connecticut State University. The NCAA Division III ballpark would remain the home of the Tides throughout their history in Connecticut. The New England Collegiate Baseball League was founded in 1993 as a five-team Connecticut league, where the Tides were the easternmost team, hence the name. Eastern was the only charter franchise to not take the name of its host community, Willimantic, which itself is a census-designated place in the town of Windham.

The first season for the Tides would result in the franchise's first and only league championship. 1994 was the first (and last) season in league history that used a point system to determine the league playoff contenders, modeled after the system used by the Cape Cod Baseball League. Eastern finished the first round in third place at 10-10, 5 games back of the first place Bristol Nighthawks. However, the second half of the season saw Eastern rebound to a 14-5 record (not including one tied ballgame that was never finished), good enough for first place, a game and a half ahead of the Middletown Giants. Overall, the Tides ended the regular season with a record of 27-17-1.

Eastern went on to defeat Bristol in the only best-of-five championship series in NECBL history. After falling in Game 1 3-2 at Bristol's Muzzy Field, Eastern rebounded to win the next two games at home, 3-2 and 3-1. The Tides traveled back to Bristol for Game 4, dropping the contest 4-3, before returning home to Eastern Connecticut State University's baseball field for a decisive Game 5, where the team crushed Bristol 11-2. University of New Haven catcher Bill Buscetto was the championship series MVP, batting .409 with 4 RBI. The win would crown the Eastern Tides as the first champions in NECBL history.

In 2016, the Mystic Schooners posted the best regular season record in the league (29-15) and won the Southern Division Championship by sweeping the Newport Gulls for the second year in a row. This set up a league championship series against the Sanford Mainers. Mystic swept the series behind all league players Nick Mascelli (Wagner College), Chase Lunceford (Louisiana Tech), Rich Slenker (Yale), Martin Figueroa (Rhode Island) and Toby Handley (Stony Brook) to win its second NECBL Championship.

Struggles at home
In 1995, the Tides again had a successful season, finishing in third place, at 19-21. Eastern fell in the first-ever league semi-finals, however, to the Waterbury Barons, two games to none. Tides player John Ellis, son of former Major League Baseball player John Charles Ellis was named to the NECBL All-League team, while fellow team member and Player of the Week Steven Hine went on to found the Steven Hine School of Baseball . Both members of the Tides later had minor league baseball careers.

The 1996 season began a long stretch of troubles for the Tides, as they finished in fifth place at 13-26, not qualifying for the postseason. In 1997, Eastern finished in sixth and last place, at 17-23. In those two seasons, Vermont assistant and future Manhattan and Maine head coach Steve Trimper served as the team's head coach. In 1998, at 15-27, the Tides again finished in sixth, though not in last place in the league.

The team's struggles fielding a competitive club continued in 1999, however, as the team once again finished in last - this time in eighth place in the NECBL. At 9-30, the Tides' 1999 season would stand as an embarrassing worst record in the league's history, 17 games back of first place. The Tides would finish seventh in 2000, with just 14 wins and 25 losses. As the franchise continued to falter on the field, so did the team's attendance. Before long, it became apparent that the team would not be able to support itself financially if things continued to progress as they were.

Final years in Willimantic 

The 2001 saw renewed success for the Tides, and their first playoff appearance since 1995. After an 8-2 performance during the last 10 games of the regular season, the Tides finished at 14-16, good enough for second place in the NECBL's newly created American Division, just one game back of the Newport Gulls. Despite having the league's seventh ranked offense and facing the number one offense in Newport, Eastern fought the Gulls to 3 games in the American Division Finals, losing the first 8 to 7 at Newport but winning Game 2 at ECSU in walk-off fashion in the bottom of the 9th, 4-3, but in front of only 187 fans, many of whom traveled from Newport, Rhode Island. Eastern dropped Game 3 at Cardines Field after losing an early lead, 12-2 the final. The Gulls went on to defeat the Keene Swamp Bats in the finals for their franchise's first NECBL Championship.

In 2002, the Eastern Tides ownership changed the name to the Thread City Tides, both in an attempt to attract more fans and to honor the local thread industry that once produced the red stitching for baseballs.[https://www.webcitation.org/5mVgr2dq0?url=http://www.necbl.com/about.htm The Tides suffered a losing season once again, however, finishing in last place in the reorganized Southern Division at 10-32, 15 games behind first place Newport. Furthermore, home attendance was only one-third what it was on the road, averaging only 201 fans per game and totaling just 4226 for the season.

Average attendance dropped to just 183 fans for the 2003 season, where the Thread City Tides would complete their final year in Connecticut at 16-25 and again eliminated from playoff competition.

The Dukes era and the American Defenders

In the spring of 2008, the Dukes' lease of Wahconah Park was jeopardized when the city demanded thousands of dollars in back maintenance fees owed by the franchise. The situation was corrected, and the Dukes' lease of the park continued through the 2008 season.

Following the 2008 season, Duquette joined forces with Buddy Lewis and Jerry O'Connor, executives of Nocona Athletic Goods Company (also known as Nokona), and retired U.S. Navy Commander Terry Allvord, founder of the U.S. Military All-Stars "Red, White and Blue Tour", to create a new ownership group dedicated to providing opportunities for members of the United States' armed forces and military academies. The group changed the name to the Pittsfield American Defenders, which has a double meaning for the U.S. military (as defenders of America), and a new glove made by Nokona, called the American Defender. The new alignment of the ownership group featured instant growth to five teams, which included the American Defenders of New Hampshire of the Can-Am League, managed by former Red Sox Brian Daubach; the U.S. Military All-Stars "Red, White and Blue Tour" (Domestic); the U.S. Military All-Stars "Red, White and Blue Diplomacy Tour" (International); and the newly minted Latin Stars. The U.S. Military All-Stars continued their reputation as a patriotic force with impressive winning credentials. They posted a record of 31-6-1 against professional and summer collegiate programs. Over 20 tour players were offered professional contracts in 2009, making it an ideal source for future talent.

In their inaugural season, the Defenders were led by former ABCA Chairman and collegiate baseball legends Dr. Carroll Land and Coach Bob Warn assisted by Coach Ron Swen. Due to the timing of the new partnership and the desire to hold as many spots as possible for players from military schools and service academies, the roster was extremely late in taking shape. The military academies had a hard time believing a premier NECBL team was interested in dedicating their efforts to provide an opportunity for their players. Add to that a stadium under construction and at one point submerged under two feet of water, and Pittsfield faced every challenge imaginable. The overmatched roster posted a 13-25 record in the West Division.

Return to Connecticut

In 2010, the New England Collegiate Baseball League Board of Directors approved the sale of the Pittsfield American Defenders to the Bristol Collegiate Baseball Club. The new ownership group moved the team to Bristol, Connecticut and played their inaugural games in Bristol at Muzzy Field as the Bristol Collegiate Baseball Club. The stay in Bristol was short lived, however, as after the first season in Bristol, the owners decided to move the team to the Mystic, CT market where the team was rebranded the Mystic Schooners. In 11 seasons, the team has qualified for the playoffs 9 times and won the Southern Division title twice (2015, 2016). After losing to the Vermont Mountaineers in the 2015 championship series, the Schooners won their first NECBL Championship in 2016. defeating the Sanford Mainers. Following the league's restructuring into three divisions prior to the 2022 season, the team now competes in the Coastal Division.

The team played its home games at Fitch Senior High School in Groton, CT before moving to Dodd Stadium in 2022. The Schooners share the stadium with the Norwich Sea Unicorns of the Futures Collegiate Baseball League.

Postseason appearances

*The NECBL did not separate into divisions until 2001. In 1994, a points system was used. From 1995 - 2000, the top four teams played each other in a league semi-final. In 2001, only 2 teams from each division qualified for the playoffs.

Individual and team achievements
The 2012 team hold the NECBL season records for highest ERA (7.22), most runs allowed (313), and most earned runs allowed (263). The 2017 team shares the NECBL single-season record for shutouts (10) with Upper Valley.

In 2017, pitcher Sonny Potter threw a no-hitter.

In 2019, T.T. Bowens set the NECBL single-season record for runs batted in (53).

Notable alumni
Players who have continued on to professional baseball careers include:

Dai Dai Otaka, who played for the team in 2019, previously worked in player development for the Houston Astros and is currently the minor league infield coordinator for the Chicago Cubs.

References

External links
 Mystic Schooners Official Site

New England Collegiate Baseball League teams
Amateur baseball teams in Connecticut
Mystic, Connecticut
1994 establishments in Connecticut
Baseball teams established in 1994